Mi lista de exes is a Mexican romantic comedy television series that aired on Las Estrellas from 30 August 2018 to 22 November 2018. Produced by Inna Payán for Televisa, based on the Israeli series Mythological Ex written by Sigal Avin. It stars Adriana Montes de Oca, Christopher Aguilasocho, Paola Fernández and Marcos Radosh. The series narrates the story of Maria, a young woman who is in search for the love of her life.

Plot 
María (Adriana Montes de Oca), is an impulsive young woman who seeks the love of her life. In her journey to find him, she resorts to the help of a tarot reader, who tells her that her love is not in the future, but in the past, and she already knows him. In addition, she warns her that if for her 30th birthday, she has not rediscovered the love of her life, she will lose every opportunity to find him. With these warnings, María will undertake a desperate search to find love, with the help of her best friends: Pedro (Christopher Aguilasocho), Ana (Paola Fernández) and Lolo (Marcos Radosh), and thus create her list of exes.

Cast 
 Adriana Montes de Oca as María, she works as a voice actress but the only thing she wants at this moment in her life is to find her soul mate. She thinks that the only thing she lacks in life is to find the love of her life
 Christopher Aguilasocho as Pedro, he is an actor, although he really works as an extra. His dream is to be a famous actor, but he is really looking to cover his problems of insecurity and shyness.
 Paola Fernández as Ana, she has known Maria since high school. She is self-confident and very sexually open and was a beauty queen, Miss Nuevo León, although she denies it.
 Marcos Radosh as Lolo, he is openly gay and was in the closet until he was 20 years old. He is afraid of falling in love because they will hurt him, like his first love.
 Claudia Ramírez as Sonia, María's mother

Episodes

References

External links 
 

Las Estrellas original programming
Mexican television sitcoms
2018 Mexican television series debuts
2018 Mexican television series endings
Television series by Televisa
Mexican LGBT-related television shows
Spanish-language television shows
2010s LGBT-related comedy television series